Burubaytal (Buyrylbaital) is a town located in the Moiynkum District, Jambyl Region, Kazakhstan. The European route E125 passes by the town.

Demographics 
According to the 2009 Kazakhstani Census, the town has a population of 336 people (162 men and 174 women).

As of 1999, the town had a population of 264 people (132 men and 132 women).

Geography

References

Populated places in Jambyl Region